Hillbilly Doomsday is a 2004 film by director Bob Ray.

Synopsis
Based on a true story, Hillbilly Doomsday is a tale of Texas' first murder of the new millennium. With Y2K paranoia at a fevered pitch, two drunken hillbilly brothers hole up in their wooded shack and await the year 2000. The second hand strikes midnight, the power shuts off and suddenly the brothers' nightmarish Y2K fears are realized. Certain that the apocalypse is upon them they hastily formulate a plan to prepare for the bleak and uncompromising future. What follows is the brutally funny, heinously violent and nearly botched murder of their survivalist cousin who they kill in an effort to steal his guns and provisions and to make ready for the new post-apocalyptic world of the future.

Production
Hillbilly Doomsday was shot in Austin, Texas in early 2001. Soon after production wrapped, the footage was lost and remained in limbo for over two years. After re-discovering the master tapes in late 2003, Hillbilly Doomsday was cut together as intended and was unleashed upon the world. Hillbilly Doomsday features Jerry “Toe” Clark of Rock Opera (the movie) fame, Michael Dalmon, and Mark Hanks and is written and directed by Bob Ray.

Reviews
"Hillbilly Doomsday, directed by Bob Ray, and based on a true story, begins as a joke but quickly escalates to an intense thriller as two Texans believe that Y2K has actually occurred and that it is essential for them to procure firearms."
-- indieWIRE

Previous Screenings
The 11th Annual New York Underground Film Festival (2004) *World Premiere*
The 11th Annual Chicago Underground Film Festival (2004)
International Competition at CinemaTexas 9 (2004)
20,000 Leagues Under the Film Industry Film Festival in Cleveland (2004)
Brew&Spooky in San Diego (2004)
Red River Rock Out Film Festival in Austin (2004)

Cast and crew
Written, directed, edited: Bob Ray
Starring: Jerry Don Clark, Michael Dalmon, Mark Hanks
Production Designer & Special Effects: Tony Linder
Music by Kurtis D. Machler
Crew: Brad Weaver, Mike Guihan, Ted Jarrell

External links
CrashCam Films home page - filmmaker Bob Ray's Austin, Texas based production company that produced Hillbilly Doomsday

2004 films
Films set in 2000
American crime thriller films
Films about hillbillies
Films shot in Austin, Texas